Mulazzano is a comune (municipality) in the Province of Lodi in the Italian region Lombardy, located about  southeast of Milan and about  southeast of Lodi.

Mulazzano borders the following municipalities: Paullo, Zelo Buon Persico, Tribiano, Dresano, Cervignano d'Adda, Casalmaiocco, Galgagnano, Tavazzano con Villavesco and Montanaso Lombardo.

References

External links
 Official website

Cities and towns in Lombardy